{{DISPLAYTITLE:C18H20N2}}
The molecular formula C18H20N2 (molar mass: 264.36 g/mol, exact mass: 264.1626 u) may refer to:

 Amezepine
 Apparicine
 Ciclopramine
 Mianserin

Molecular formulas